Oncology Information System (OIS) is a software solution that manages departmental, administrative and clinical activities. It aggregates information into a complete oncology-specific electronic medical record to support medical information management. The Oncology Information System allows the capture of patient history information, the documentation of the treatment response, medical prescription of the treatment, the storage of patient documentation and the capture of activities for billing purposes.

Unlike a Hospital Information System (HIS) or Radiological Information System (RIS) , the Oncology Information System (OIS) supports the delivery of integrated care and long-term treatment for cancer patients by collecting data during various phases of treatment of cancer, maintaining a history of treatment fractions, screening, prevention, diagnosis, image reviews, palliative care and end-of-life care.

Basic features of an OIS 
OIS generally support the following features:

 Treatment workflow
 Doctor's prescription
 Patient register
 Management of the treatment schedule
 Management of patient documents
 Financial control
 Health Level 7(HL7) and DICOM RT interoperability

References 

Radiation therapy
Medical physics
Electronic health records